Kerrie Taurima (born Kerrie Perkins on 2 April 1979) is an Australian long jumper. She had a promising career as a junior athlete, and trained at the Australian Institute of Sport, but went on a two-year hiatus in 2000 after failing to progress up the senior ranks. She made a successful return, and won the national long jump title in 2004 and 2005. However, after winning the title in 2005 she was unable to attend the World Championships in that year due to injury. The following year she won a silver medal in the long jump at the 2006 Commonwealth Games, coming in second place to compatriot Bronwyn Thompson.
Kerrie Taurima was married to the former Australian long jumper Jai Taurima.,

International competitions

References

External links
Athletics Australia Profile

1979 births
Living people
Australian female long jumpers
Athletes (track and field) at the 2006 Commonwealth Games
Australian Institute of Sport track and field athletes
Commonwealth Games medallists in athletics
Commonwealth Games silver medallists for Australia
Competitors at the 2003 Summer Universiade
Medallists at the 2006 Commonwealth Games